Demirar is a rural locality (a selo) in Kilersky Selsoviet, Dokuzparinsky District, Republic of Dagestan, Russia. The population was 103 as of 2010.

Geography 
Demirar is located 5 km southwest of Usukhchay (the district's administrative centre) by road. Kavalar and Chuvalar are the nearest rural localities.

Nationalities 
Lezgins live there.

References 

Rural localities in Dokuzparinsky District